Mario Minatelli (29 June 1925 – 11 January 1990) was an Italian boxer. He competed in the men's lightweight event at the 1948 Summer Olympics.

References

External links
 

1925 births
1990 deaths
Italian male boxers
Olympic boxers of Italy
Boxers at the 1948 Summer Olympics
Sportspeople from Dubrovnik
Lightweight boxers
20th-century Italian people